Conspiracy to defraud is an offence under the common law of England and Wales and Northern Ireland.

England and Wales
The standard definition of a conspiracy to defraud was provided by Lord Dilhorne in Scott v Metropolitan Police Commissioner, when he said that  Conspiracy to defraud therefore contains two key elements; that the conspiracy involved dishonesty, and that if the conspiracy was undertaken, the victim's property rights would be harmed. This does not require the defendants' actions to directly result in the fraud; in R v Hollinshead, the House of Lords held that producing devices designed to alter electricity meter readings constituted conspiracy to defraud, even though the actual fraud would be carried out by members of the public rather than the conspirators. In two situations, it will not even be necessary for the actions to directly lead to any kind of financial loss for the victim; these are when the conspirators plan to deceive a person holding public office into acting counter to their duties, and when the conspirators know that their actions put the victim's property at risk, even if the risk never materialises.

The following cases are also relevant to this offence:
R v Orbell (1703) 6 Mod Rep 42, (1703) 12 Mod Rep 499
R v Button (1848) 11 QB 929, (1848) 18 LJMC 19, (1848) 12 LT (OS) 309, (1848) 13 JP 20, (1848) 12 Jur 1017, (1848) 3 Cox 229
R v Yates (1853) 6 Cox 441
R v De Kromme (1892) 66 LT 301, (1892) 56 JP 683, (1892) 8 TLR 325, (1892) 17 Cox 492
R v Quinn (1898) 19 Cox 78
R v Boyle and Mears, 94 Cr App R 158, CA

Although most frauds are crimes, it is irrelevant for these purposes whether the agreement would amount to a crime if carried out. If the victim has suffered of any financial or other prejudice there of, there is no need to establish that the defendant deceived him or her. But, following Scott v Metropolitan Police Commissioner (1974) 3 All ER 1032, it is necessary to prove that the victim was dishonestly deceived by one or more of the parties to the agreement into running an economic risk that he or she would not otherwise have run, if the victim has not suffered any loss. For the mens rea, it is necessary to prove that "the purpose of the conspirators (was) to cause the victim economic loss" (per Lord Diplock in Scott). For the test of dishonesty, see R v Ghosh (1982) 2 All ER 689.

Relationship to statutory conspiracy etc
Section 32(1)(a) of the Theft Act 1968 did not, by abolishing the common law offence of cheating, thereby abolish the common law offence of conspiracy to defraud.

Section 5(1) of the Criminal Law Act 1977 does not affect the common law offence of conspiracy so far as it relates to conspiracy to defraud.

Section 12(1) of the Criminal Justice Act 1987 provides that:

Paragraphs (a) and (b) are derived from section 1(1) of the Criminal Law Act 1977 and refer to the offence that that section creates.

As to section 12, see R v Rimmington, R v Goldstein [2005] UKHL 63.

History

Before 20 July 1987, section 1 of the Criminal Law Act 1977 did not apply in any case where the agreement in question amounted to a conspiracy to defraud at common law.

Incitement to conspire
See section 5(7) of the Criminal Law Act 1977.

Indictment
See the following cases:
R v Landy and others, [1981] 1 WLR 355, 72 Cr App R 237, [1981] 1 All ER 1172, [1981] Crim LR 326, CA
R v Cohen and others, The Independent, 29 July 1992, CA

History

The following specimen count was formerly contained in paragraph 13 of the Second Schedule to the Indictments Act 1915 before it was repealed.

Mode of trial and sentence
A person guilty of conspiracy to defraud is liable on conviction on indictment to imprisonment for any term not exceeding ten years, or to a fine, or to both.

Jurisdiction
Conspiracy to defraud is a Group B offence for the purposes of Part I of the Criminal Justice Act 1993.

See the following cases:
Attorney General's Reference (No 1 of 1982) [1983] QB 751, [1983] 3 WLR 72, [1983] 2 All ER 721, [1983] Crim LR 534
DPP v Doot and others [1973] AC 807, [1973] 2 WLR 532, [1973] 1 All ER 940, 57 Cr App R 600, [1973] Crim LR 292, HL
Board of Trade v Owen [1957] AC 602, [1957] 2 WLR 351, [1957] 1 All ER 411, 41 Cr App R 11, affirming R v Owen [1957] 1 QB 174

Northern Ireland
Article 13(1) of the Criminal Attempts and Conspiracy (Northern Ireland) Order 1983 (S.I. 1983/1120 (N.I. 13)) does not affect the common law offence of conspiracy so far as it relates to conspiracy to defraud.

See article 11 of the Criminal Justice (Serious Fraud) (Northern Ireland) Order 1988 (S.I. 1988/1846 (N.I. 16))

See also
Conspiracy (criminal)

References

Bibliography
Law Commission Report No 228 "Conspiracy To Defraud" (1994)
Smith, J. C. "Some Comments On The Law Commission's Report" (1995) CLR 209.

Crown Prosecution Service. Sentencing Manual - Conspiracy to Defraud (Common Law)
Her Majesty's Attorney General. Guidance on Use of the common law offence of Conspiracy to Defraud January 2007. 

Conspiracy (criminal)
Common law offences in England and Wales